{{DISPLAYTITLE:C4H6Cl2}}
The molecular formula C4H6Cl2 (molar mass: 124.996 g/mol, exact mass: 123.9847 u) may refer to:

 1,1-Bis(chloromethyl)ethylene
 1,4-Dichlorobut-2-ene

Molecular formulas